Gamal Mohamed Hassan (born June 1978) Also, Jamal is the son of the well known late Chief  Al-Haji Mohamed Hassan Muse and he was the founder, mayor to his last day and the first settler of that City Dhahar, in Sanaag region. Also, Jamal is a Somali politician who was the former Minister of Planning and International Cooperation of the Federal Government of Somalia. Prior to this position, Mr. Hassan served as the Ambassador Extraordinary and Plenipotentiary of the Federal Republic of Somalia to the Republic of Kenya.

Biography 
He was previously a senior official at the U.S diplomatic mission in Nairobi, Kenya. On 2 April 2015, Hassan was appointed as the new Ambassador of Somalia to Kenya.

Before joining the Government, he served as a Senior Political Advisor to the United States Special Representative for Somalia (SRS) on political affairs and related democracy, governance, and human rights issues. 

He has also worked for the Government of Canada, Carleton University in Ottawa, and Canadem in Ukraine, and studied at Carleton and MOI Universities and obtained BA in Political Science and MA in Diplomacy and Foreign Policy respectively. Mr. Jamal Hassan is married with three children.

References

Living people
Ambassadors of Somalia to Kenya
Somalian diplomats
Year of birth missing (living people)